Walter Raleigh Dickson (December 3, 1878 – December 9, 1918), nicknamed "Hickory", was a Major League Baseball player who played pitcher from -. Dickson played for the Boston Braves, Pittsburgh Rebels, and New York Giants.

External links

1878 births
1918 deaths
Boston Braves players
New York Giants (NL) players
Pittsburgh Rebels players
Major League Baseball pitchers
Baseball players from Texas
Temple Boll Weevils players
Grand Rapids Wolverines players
Birmingham Barons players
Memphis Turtles players
Houston Buffaloes players
People from Cherokee County, Texas
Greenville Midlands players